The 2002 Sam Houston State Bearkats football team represented Sam Houston State University as a member of the Southland Football League during the 2002 NCAA Division I-AA football season. Led by 21st-year head coach Ron Randleman, the Bearkats compiled an overall record of 4–7 with a mark of 2–4 in conference play, and finished tied for fifth in the Southland.

Schedule

References

Sam Houston State
Sam Houston Bearkats football seasons
Sam Houston State Bearkats football